Richardson W. Schell (born 1951 in Evansville, Illinois) is an Episcopal priest who has served as the headmaster of Kent School from 1981 until 2020. During his tenure, he was recognized for his leadership during the consolidation of separate boys and girls campuses into one fully coeducational school.

Early life
Schell graduated from Kent School in 1969, Harvard College in 1973 and Yale Divinity School in 1976. He became an ordained Episcopal minister and worked in business upon graduation from Yale.

Kent School
Schell joined the faculty of Kent School in 1980 as the chairman of the Theology Department and the school chaplain. He became headmaster of the school a year later. 1987–92, he led the consolidation of two separate boys and girls campuses into one. He also led multiple expansions of the school. In mid 2019 he announced his retirement as headmaster of Kent School. He officially left in June 2020 at the end of the 2019–20 school year.

References

1951 births
Living people
20th-century American Episcopal priests
Harvard College alumni
Heads of American boarding schools
Kent School alumni
People from Randolph County, Illinois
Yale Divinity School alumni
21st-century American Episcopal priests